The inauguration of Alberto Fernández as president of Argentina took place on 10 December 2019.

Alberto Fernández wished for the bulk of the ceremony, including the concession of the presidential symbols, to take place in the Congressional Palace (as in the previous inaugurations of Néstor Kirchner and Cristina Fernández de Kirchner), rather than in the Casa Rosada, as it was the case in 2015. In the end the outgoing president, Mauricio Macri reluctantly approved.

As planned, he was sworn in at the Chamber of Deputies Hall of the National Congress, before outgoing President Mauricio Macri, outgoing Vice President Gabriela Michetti and Vice President-elect Cristina Fernández de Kirchner, who also assumed as Vice President.

During a 1 hour-long speech, President Alberto Fernández broadly described the state of affairs in Argentina and vowed to revive growth to escape from "virtual default".

Once in the Casa Rosada, Fernández and Felipe Solá (Foreign Minister-designate), met with the international guests in the afternoon.

Later in the afternoon, Fernández administered the oath of office to the ministers of the cabinet.

Prior to the inauguration, the fences in the Plaza de Mayo had been removed. Peronist sympathizers gathered around the Plaza de Mayo and the Congress to celebrate the presidential inauguration. In the former, a music festival took place throughout the afternoon. At the end, President Fernández spoke to the crowd gathered there.

International attendees
Attendees listed in the order in which they were received by Fernández and Solá.

Sovereign states

International organizations

References 

Presidency of Alberto Fernández
Fernández, Alberto